Prashanti Tipirneni is an Indian costume designer and producer who is noted for her work in Telugu films. She started her career with the 2010 film Vedam and later worked for the Baahubali film series. She was nominated along with Rama Rajamouli for Best Costume Design at the 42nd Saturn Awards and at the 12th Asian Film Awards for Baahubali 1 and Baahubali 2 respectively.

Tipirneni ventured into film production with Awe (2018) under her production studio Wall Poster Cinema in association with actor Nani.

Films

As a costume designer

As a producer

References

3. Information on wall Poster cinema

External links

Living people
Indian costume designers
Film people from Andhra Pradesh
Year of birth missing (living people)

Indian film producers
Film producers from Andhra Pradesh
Telugu film producers